Olearia lasiophylla  is a species of flowering plant in the family Asteraceae and is endemic to south-eastern New South Wales. It is a shrub with hairy, elliptic leaves and white or mauve, and yellow daisy-like inflorescences.

Description
Flowering occurs from November to February and the fruit is a silky-hairy achene, the pappus with 39–52 bristles in two rows.

Taxonomy
Olearia lasiophylla was first formally described in 1991 by Nicholas Sèan Lander in the journal Telopea from plant material collected near Mount Townsend by Neridah Clifton Ford in 1959. The specific epithet (lasiophylla) means "woolly-leaved".

Distribution and habitat
Olearia lasiophylla grows in forest on steep slopes near Geehi Reservoir in Kosciuszko National Park.

References

lasiophylla
Flora of New South Wales
Plants described in 1991